KMPX (channel 29) is a television station licensed to Decatur, Texas, United States, serving the Dallas–Fort Worth metroplex as an affiliate of the Spanish-language Estrella TV network. It is owned by Tegna Inc. alongside Dallas-licensed ABC affiliate WFAA (channel 8). KMPX's offices are located on Gateway Drive in Irving, and its transmitter is located in Cedar Hill, Texas. Master control and most internal operations are based at the WFAA Communications Center Studios on Young Street in Downtown Dallas.

KMPX is the largest primary Estrella TV affiliate by market size that is not owned and operated by the network's parent company Estrella Media, although it was previously owned by Estrella Media from 2004 until 2020.

History

Prior history of UHF channel 29 in Dallas–Fort Worth
Channel 29 was originally allocated to Dallas, and two construction permits were issued for the channel. One was to be KLIF-TV, the television counterpart to radio station KLIF (1190 AM), owned by Gordon McLendon. A second attempt was made in 1962 to launch KAEI-TV on channel 29. Owned by and named for Automated Electronics Inc., the station would have broadcast printed quotes, news, and weather information. Since television sets were not required to include UHF tuners until the All-Channel Receiver Act went into effect in 1964, the company proposed to lease converters and UHF antennas to companies to install in their offices. Though the group hoped to be weeks away from signing the station on the air and gave dates of April 15 and June 1 for a planned sign-on, AEI never put it into service. The company's assets were acquired in late 1963.

In 1966, three applicants filed to build new stations on channel 29—Grandview Broadcasting (which later took itself out of the running), Overmyer Communications, and Maxwell Electronics. In a successful bid to give both applicants a channel, Overmyer proposed changing out channel 29 for channels 27 and 33 at Dallas; Overmyer never built its station on channel 27, and Maxwell signed on KMEC-TV on channel 33 in October 1967.

KMPX station history
In 1985, three applicants vied for a license to operate a television station on channel 29, including the Wise County Messenger newspaper, owned by former WBAP-TV (channel 5, now KXAS-TV) anchor Roy Eaton, whose petition had resulted in the allocation to Decatur. After a settlement was reached, the construction permit was granted to Decatur Telecasting, owned by Charlotte, North Carolina, housewife Karen Hicks, in December 1985. However, an unanticipated setback in the form of the sale of its planned tower site to new owners who would not allow the station to locate there led to years of delays and a sale to Word of God Fellowship, the ministry of the Daystar Television Network, owned by Marcus and Joni Lamb.

In 2003, Daystar acquired Denton-licensed noncommercial station KDTN (channel 2) from North Texas Public Broadcasting. KMPX was then sold to Liberman Broadcasting (which was renamed Estrella Media in February 2020, following a corporate reorganization of the company under private equity firm HPS Investment Partners, LLC), a sale that was finalized on January 13, 2004; after Liberman took over on that date, the station was converted into a Spanish-language independent station featuring programming distributed by the company. On September 14, 2009, KMPX became a charter owned-and-operated station of Liberman's Estrella TV network, which carries some programming seen during the station's tenure as an independent.

Sale to Tegna
On September 25, 2020, it was announced that Tegna Inc. (owner of ABC affiliate WFAA, channel 8) would acquire KMPX for $19 million. The deal includes a five-year affiliation agreement between Estrella and Tegna, as well as an option for Estrella to purchase WFAA's VHF license. The transaction for KMPX was completed on November 20.

The station was purchased to solve long-term problems with WFAA's digital signal on VHF physical channel 8, as Tegna has been unable to acquire its own construction permit to move WFAA to UHF. Thus, KMPX is utilized to provide a full-market high definition simulcast of WFAA's main channel, which maps on KMPX's spectrum to channel 8.8. It also carries Twist from Tegna, which was launched on April 5, 2021, on channel 8.9.

If the five-year agreement to sell the station to Estrella is carried out in full, Estrella would purchase the license and transmitter assets of WFAA, and the two stations would swap physical channels, with WFAA then taking KMPX's FCC facility ID and in technicality, KMPX moving to the channel 8 facility ID established in 1949.

Pending sale to Cox Media Group 
On February 22, 2022, Tegna announced that it would be acquired by Standard General and Apollo Global Management for $5.4 billion. As a part of the deal, KMPX and WFAA, along with their Austin sister station KVUE and Houston sister stations KHOU and KTBU, would be resold to Cox Media Group.

Technical information

Subchannels
The station's digital signal is multiplexed:

Analog-to-digital conversion
KMPX shut down its analog signal, over UHF channel 29, on June 12, 2009, as part of the federally mandated transition from analog to digital television. The station's digital signal remained on its pre-transition UHF channel 30, using PSIP to display KMPX's virtual channel as 29 on digital television receivers.

References

External links

DFW Radio/TV History

KMPX
Television channels and stations established in 1993
1993 establishments in Texas
Estrella TV affiliates
Twist (TV network) affiliates
Tegna Inc.
KMPX
Wise County, Texas